Pendle Hill railway station is located on the Main Western line, serving the Sydney suburb of Pendle Hill. It is served by Sydney Trains T1 Western and T5 Cumberland line services.

History
Pendle Hill station opened on 12 April 1924. The station was rebuilt in the 1940s when the Main Western line was quadrupled.

In August 2017, work was completed on an upgrade to the station. Like the neighbouring stations at Wentworthville and Toongabbie. The upgrade included a new footbridge, concourse and lifts as part of the Station Accessibility Upgrade Program.

Platforms and services

References

External links

Pendle Hill station details Transport for New South Wales

Easy Access railway stations in Sydney
Main Western railway line, New South Wales
Railway stations in Sydney
Railway stations in Australia opened in 1924
Cumberland Council, New South Wales